Mizhikal Sakshi is a 2008 Indian Malayalam-language drama film directed by Asok R. Nath and starring Sukumari and Mohanlal.

Plot
Sukumari plays a key role of an aged lady named Kuniyamma and Mohanlal in a guest role, as Kuniyamma's son. Kuniyamma's son, Syed Ahmed, an idealistic teacher. But due to misfortune he was accused to be jehad bomber, and was sentenced to death on charges of being an extremist. This incident ruined her life, and her life was never the same again. The news of her son's hanging shattered Nabisa and she loses her mental balance. And then, she begins a search for her son, not ready to face the reality that her son is dead. Movie depicted the present kerala society in a secular way.

Cast

Soundtrack
The movie features and acclaimed soundtrack composed by maestro V. Dakshinamoorthy and lyrics penned by O. N. V Kurup.

References

External links
 

2008 films
2000s Malayalam-language films
Films about organised crime in India
Films about terrorism in India
Secularism in India